Flightpath or trajectory is the path of a moving object.

Flightpath or flight path may also refer to:
 Flight path, an airplane route
 Flightpath (marketing agency), a New York-based digital creative agency
 FlightPath (software), an academic advising software
 Flight Path Learning Center
 FlightPathTV, a television show
 Flight Path (album), an album by Sphere
 "Flight Path", a 1971 episode of TV series UFO
Flight Path (memoir), a 2017 memoir by Hannah Palmer

See also 
 Flight Paths, an album by The Paradise Motel
 Airway (disambiguation)
 Flight plan (disambiguation)
 Flyway (disambiguation)
 Flyway for birds